Bolkowice may refer to the following places in Poland:
Bolkowice, Lower Silesian Voivodeship (south-west Poland)
Bolkowice, West Pomeranian Voivodeship (north-west Poland)